ARY may stand for:

 Abdul Razzak Yaqoob, a Pakistani expatriate businessman
 Andre Romelle Young, real name of Dr. Dre
 Ary and the Secret of Seasons, an action adventure video game
 ARY Digital, a Pakistani television network
 ARY Digital Network, a subsidiary of the ARY Group
 ARY Musik (formerly The Musik), a Pakistani Urdu-English music channel
 ARY News, a Pakistani news channel
 ARY One World, a bilingual news channel in English and Urdu
 ARY, the IATA airport code for the Ararat Airport
 ary, ISO 639-3 code for the Moroccan Arabic language
 Ary (footballer) (1919-unknown), Ary Nogueira Cezar, Brazilian footballer

See also
 Arry (disambiguation)
 Arrie (disambiguation)